Yunus Parvez (1931/1932 – 11 February 2007) was an Indian actor who played supporting roles in over 200 films from the late 1960s to the 2000s. He is best known for his roles in films like Garm Hava (1974), Deewaar (1975), Trishul (1978), Gol Maal (1979) and Mr. India (1987). His last film role was in Shaad Ali's hit film Bunty Aur Babli (2005).
Yunus Parvez fought 1998 Indian general election as a candidate of Samajwadi Party but could not secure much votes.

His son Arshad Khan is married to the daughter of film actor Vikas Anand. Parvez died in Mumbai on 11 February 2007 at the age of 75 of acute diabetes.

Filmography

TV serial

References

External links
 
 

2007 deaths
Deaths from diabetes
Indian male film actors
People from Ghazipur
Male actors in Hindi cinema
Male actors from Mumbai
20th-century Indian male actors